Nicole Fiscella (born September 15, 1979) is an American actress and model, best known for her role as Isabel Coates on The CW's teen drama television series Gossip Girl.

Early life
Nicole Fiscella was born on September 15, 1979, at the Lenox Hill Hospital in Manhattan, New York. She is of Indian and St Lucian ancestry. Her parents are physicians and she has a younger brother, Chaz. Fiscella was in the All-State Jazz Choir with director and political activist, Jim Augustine. Fiscella graduated from Tufts University with a Bachelor of Arts in Anthropology. She also has a Master's degree in Human Nutrition from the University of Bridgeport and is a certified nutritionist.  When asked why she wanted to study Nutrition, by The New York Observer, Fiscella replied "Both of my parents are doctors, so we were always the health-nut family. I think I always wanted to do something in the medical field a little bit, but not as far as being a doctor, so this is a good median".

Career
In 2005, Fiscella started her modeling career under New York Model Management. She has appeared in numerous fashion magazines, including Elle, Essence and Cosmopolitan, and featured in campaigns for J.Crew, Pantene, Banana Republic and GAP Body. She modeled for the Bobbi Brown Cosmetics' makeup manual.

Fiscella starred in seasons one, two and four in the role of Isabel Coates, a loyal friend of Blair Waldorf (played by Leighton Meester) in The CW's teen drama series Gossip Girl (2007–2011). The series revolved around the lives of privileged upper-class adolescents living in Manhattan's Upper East Side. She also starred as the Lead Girl in LL Cool J's music video for the song "Baby".

As of May 2020, Fiscella works as a certified nutritionist, and is also an active blogger and a lifestyle influencer on all things natural and nutrition. She runs "Global Go to Girl" blog, which includes healthy recipes and travel recommendations.

Personal life
Fiscella lives in Colorado with her husband and three children.

Filmography

References

External links

Female models from New York (state)
American television actresses
Tufts University School of Arts and Sciences alumni
1979 births
Living people
Pittsford Mendon High School alumni
University of Bridgeport alumni
Actresses from New York City
People from Manhattan
African-American actresses
American actresses of Indian descent
American people of Saint Lucian descent
Actresses from Rochester, New York
21st-century African-American people
21st-century African-American women
20th-century African-American people
20th-century African-American women